EToy or EToys may refer to:
 Etoy, Switzerland, a small town
 Etoys (programming language), an educational programming language
 eToys.com, a Dot-com era company/website
 etoy, a conceptual art group
  Electronic toys, typically built for and used by children
 Educational toys, typically built for and used by children